Genealogy also known as family history, is the study of families and the tracing of their lineages and history.

Genealogy may also refer to:
Genealogy (philosophy), a historical technique in philosophy in which one questions the commonly understood emergence of various philosophical and social beliefs by attempting to account for the scope, breadth or totality of ideology within the time period in question, as opposed to focusing on a singular or dominant ideology. Considered continuation of the works of Friedrich Nietzsche.

Entertainment
Fire Emblem: Genealogy of the Holy War, a 1996 video game
Genealogy (band), 6-member Armenian supergroup formed to represent Armenia in the Eurovision Song Contest 2015 from Armenia and five continents where Armenian diaspora is present

See also
List of genetic genealogy topics
Genealogy book, register used to record the family history of ancestors
Genealogy tree, alternative term for Family tree
Genealogy software, computer software used to record, organize, and publish genealogical data
GenealogyJ, software for editors for genealogic data, hobbyists, family historians and genealogy researchers
Academic genealogy, concerned with organizing a 'family tree' of scientists and scholars according to mentoring relationships